There are over 9300 Grade I listed buildings in England.  This page is a list of these buildings in the county of East Sussex.

Eastbourne

|}

Hastings

|}

Lewes

|}

Rother

|}

The City of Brighton and Hove

|}

Wealden

|}

See also
 Grade II* listed buildings in East Sussex

Notes

References 
National Heritage List for England

External links

 
East Sussex
Lists of Grade I listed buildings in East Sussex